Szathmári Sándor (19 June 1897 – 16 July 1974) was a Hungarian writer, mechanical engineer, Esperantist, and one of the leading figures in Esperanto literature.

Biography

Family background
Szathmári was born in Gyula. Szathmári's grandfather was a woodworker, who gave 100 forints for the founding of a local music school. His father, also called Sándor, studied law. He was an official of the Austro-Hungarian Empire. He authored law books as a hobby, played the violin and painted. His father, the first intellectual in the family, and his ancestors spelled the family name with a "y" (Szathmáry). Szathmári's mother (Losonczy-Szíjjártó Margit) came from a pharmacist family in the city of Szeghalom, where she was the sole daughter of the family and lived well. She bore 11 children, of whom only seven grew to adulthood.

Early life
The family moved often. They lived in Gyula, Szombathely, Alsókubin, Sepsiszentgyörgy, and Lugos during Szathmári's early years. The young Szathmári was sickly with a weak body and a sensitive nervous system up through his fifteenth year. He disliked wrestling, horseplay, and boxing. The youth suffered almost continually from angina; he was also tormented by typhus, measles, chickenpox, whooping cough, diphtheria, and sinusitis.

According to a fragment of an unpublished biography Hogy is volt hát? ("So how did it happen?"), his grandfather wanted to train and educate him in patriotism and nationalism, but was unsuccessful.  "..my grandfather told me the anecdote in which the gypsy asked to be shown the enemy before a battle, because he wanted to make peace with them.  At that time I thought the anecdote true, and considered the gypsys more advanced, being they were only ones able to think right.”

After the death of his two older brothers, he became the eldest child (the fourth sibling died later), and often had to take care of the younger ones. That task quite exhausted him, and when the five-month-old little brother John died of meningitis, he went into shock. "The weeping suddenly weakened and finally stopped.  After a few minutes pause I heard my father's voice: When will we bury this child?" For a long time after that he was unable to sleep peacefully.

While attending the first class in elementary school he finished the exercises in his mathematics text in one week, without knowing the formulas. He was apt, by some accounts more intelligent than his teacher, which led to his teacher giving him a failing grade to make him repeat the school year. He was let through regardless. This conduct, which he never forgot for the rest of his life, affected him. He referred to his perceived enemies as  "muscle-fools".

Later studies
Szathmári was capable in other natural sciences, such as physics and chemistry. He had a good imagination, liked to experiment and wanted to become an engineer. Szathmári graduated in Lugos (now Lugoj, Romania) and in 1915 enrolled in the mechanical engineering program at the Technical University of Budapest (Hungary), but found this dull and, as he perceived it, limiting to his thoughts. During his studies, conducted under wartime conditions, he lacked sufficient money, and was often hungry. He took a break from his studies during 1919-1921 and returned to Lugos. In the beginning he wanted to leave Budapest only provisionally because of the communist rule, but an opportunity to teach students at home developed.

Life after graduation
Following the Treaty of Trianon, Lugos was part of Romania. The Romanians made life difficult for Hungarians and Hungarian officials. In 1921, Szathmári's father has to choose whether to continue serving the Romanian government or to travel to Hungary.  The father stayed with the six children and undertook the process of becoming a Romanian official, which cost him the sympathy of his acquaintances, the local Hungarians. After this sacrifice, the Romanian government retired him and forgot to pay his pension.

Szathmári siblings did not get an opportunity to study at a college or university. Szathmári himself had to often interrupt his studies to help his family. He began working in 1920 in the Ruskica marble mine as a technician.  There he noticed that the mine was tricking the workers by paying a single banknote to three workers.  he workers had to travel and spend their own money and time to get change there. He protested, but did not dare further to make waves.

Although the Hungarian army six times found him unsuitable for recruitment, the Romanian army required him to enlist. Szathmári decided to return to Hungary and finish his studies. In the spring of 1921, he returned and was approved for a tuition waver. He completed his studies after five years in 1926. During 1921-1922 he was unhappy, hungry, and often homeless or living in unheated mass accommodations.

In 1923, Szathmári worked in Gyula as an office worker and lived with relatives. (Earlier, he had taken gravely ill and had been hospitalized). In July 1923 his father died.  He lived in actual student housing between 1924 and 1926.  Later he studied next to his work in the Gschwindt plant, and afterwards in the Martin-and-Sigray plant. Starting in 1924 he worked at MÁVAG, railway machinery plant, and began his true professional life.

Politics while a student 
During his studies, Szathmári participated in the [[Székely Egyetemi és Foiskolai Hallgatók 
Egyesülete]] (SZEFHE, Association of Students of the Sikuly University and Institutions of Higher Learning), where he became acquainted with the Habsburgellenes Liga (Anti-Habsburg League) and the Association of Bartha Miklós (BARTHA Miklós Társaság). When Charles IV wanted to retake the Hungarian throne in 1921, the young people took up arms at the call of these organizations and awaited battle at Kelenföld, but without adequate ammunition.

Professional life 
From 1924 to 1957, Szathmári worked as an engineer at the Hungarian State Wagonworks (Hungarian acronym: MÁVAG) in the Hungarian ministry of heavy industry and in the project bureau.

Spiritual development

Esperanto 
In the empire,the family most often worked among minorities (Slovaks in Alsókubin; Romanians and Germans in Lugos). The young Szathmari was struck early with the problem of interethnic communication. Some Slovaks, for example, laughed at him, when he couldn't understand them. He felt himself already an Esperantist in spirit, since he began wishing for a language that would bind the ethnic groups together.

In a bookshop, in Lugos he found and purchased a book of Esperanto grammar. He began to learn Esperanto only in 1919, when he returned to Lugos, where he organized the Széchenyi Circle (pronounced. Se’tsenyi), which was the basis of the Free Organization of Christian-socialist Students. With his friends in the circle, he set about learning Esperanto, but without a teacher. They were successful. Szathmári became a speaker of the language starting in 1935, when he participated in the a workers' culture course in Budapest, taught by the famous Esperantist poet Emeriko Baranyai, who helped Szathmári find his way to SAT, of which he remained a member until his 1974 death in Budapest.

Other ideologies 
Szathmári became acquainted with Christian-socialist ideas in 1918. He believed in Jesus, but, following his father's example, did not attend churches. When the family lived in Szombathely, his father wanted to enroll him in the Roman Catholic School, as it was the closest. The school would not admit him, as he was not Roman Catholic. The instructors were surprised, but accepted his father's offer to have his son baptized. The baptism did not take place but he still he was allowed to study in the elementary school. Szathmari remained reformed for life, and when he was buried, the services were even led by a reformed pastor.

When the family moved to Alsókubin, the Lutheran pastor explained that they had previously learned errors and could only learn true (Lutheran) faith. Although he left the church, Szathmári remained devout.

Politics after his studies 
In the mid-1920s, Szathmári hdiscovered the ideas of Szabó Dezso (sAbo’ dejo’) and spent some time on the ideological right.  As he was the chief secretary of the Anti-Habsburg League, his landlord evicted him. He was managing director during 1932-1933 of the BARTHA Miklós Association. Beginning in 1935, he worked in collaboration with the Hungarian Communist Party, but in 1948 he became disillusioned and disowned Communism.

Szathmari and literature 
At an early age, Szathmári enjoyed Bible stories, but until 1917 did not take an interest in literature His literature teacher in high school was Vajthoó László, who got many students interested in literature.  The young Szathmáry thought writing novels a bore compared to inventing ideas for machine.

In 1917, Szathmári became acquainted with the works of Frigyes Karinthy (pron. kArinti frItyes), whom he later came to adore.  Influenced by Karinthy, he began working during 1919–1921 on a mathematics textbook and put on paper his first small attempts at belles lettres, called The Serious Person (A komoly ember ~a kOmoy Ember). This works evinces a satirical view of someone who speaks of pacifist convictions, but who in the end resorts to violence.

During 1930–1934, Szathmári worked on a trilogy of novels, but when that was ready, which, on their completion, as he did not"recognize them as his own work, he decided to let remain unpublished.

In 1935, he began his magnum opus, Kazohinia (Gulliver utazása Kazohiniában, Budapest 1941; Kazohinia Budapest 1957, 1972), a work of satirical science fiction. The 1946 edition contains text left out earlier due to military censorship, and new details were added. He would  modify the 1957 edition.

Works in Esperanto 
The international Esperanto movement became acquainted with his name only in 1958, after the appearance of his novel Kazohinia in Esperanto (Vojaĝo al Kazohinio). However, he himself said that his first article in Esperanto appeared in 1934 in Sennaciulo (The Nationless). 
Between the years 1937 kaj 1942, Szathmari was the managing president of the Hungarian Esperanto-Society.

In addition to Vojaĝo al Kazohinio, which was originally written in 1935, and before the appearance of the Esperanto original, which was published three times in Hungarian translation, there appeared in book form Szathmári's short story collection Maŝinmondo ("MachineWorld") (J. Régulo, 1964), Tréfán kívül, a translation into Hungarian of the Esperanto novel Kredu min, sinjorino! ~Believe me, Mamm by Cezaro Rossetti (1957) and the Esperanto translation of a Hungarian children's book Cxu ankau vi scias? )"Do you Know it Too?").  Szathmári is represented in the short story anthology 33 Rakontoj ("33 Stories") (J. Régulo, 1964) with one short story.

Other short fiction by Szathmári appeared in reviews such as 'Norda Prismo, La Nica Literatura Revuo, Belarto, Monda Kulturo and Hungara Vivo.  He contributed with articles about the Esperanto movement and about literary themes to other magazines.  Szathmari was not prolific, but, despite stylistic deficiencies (which some have emphasized), put himself himself up  one of the most serious contributors to Esperanto prose and was arguably the only writer of Esperanto prose notable outside of its circle of speakers. His work regularly dealt with the future of humanity.

The Matter of Tamkó Sirató Károly 

In 1924, in his new lodgings he met a youth, with whom he became friends and later enemies. His roommate at school was Tamkó Sirató Károly, then still Tamkó Károly, who was studying law and who later became an eminence in Hungarian avant-garde poetry. He started a lawsuit in 1958 against  Szathmári, claiming that he too collaborated in the writing of Kazohinia.  Szathmári won the lawsuit. (Tamkó started the lawsuit only after the third edition (1957)). Szathmári's novel Hiába ("In Vain") could be proven to be in the same style as that of the winner, but the appearance of this anti-Communist work in 1958 would have put him in danger of prison. Tamkó read Szathmári's trilogy only in 1936, when he returned from Paris.

List of works

Original

In Esperanto 
 Vojago al Kazohinio (SAT, 1958) ("Voyage to Kazohinia")
 Masinmondo kaj aliaj noveloj (1964) ("MachineWorld and other Stories")
 Kain kaj Abel (1977) ("Cain and Abel")
 Perfekta civitano (La Laguna, 1964) (1988) ("A Perfect Citizen") (a short story collection with bibliography)

Satirical works
 Perfekta civitano (1956) ("A Perfect Citizen")
 Pythagoras (1957?)
 Logos (1961)
 La fluidumo de la ciovido (1962)
 Honorigo (1963)
 Liriko (1964)
 Genezo (1965)
 Enciclopeditis (1966)
 Budapesta ekzameno (1968)
 Kain kaj Abel (1968)
 Tria prego de Pygmalion (1969) ("Pygmalion's Third Prayer")
 La falsa auguro (1970) ("The False Prophecy")
 La guarbo (1970)
 Kuracistaj historioj (1972) ("Physician's Stories")
 La barbaro (1972) ("The Barbarian")
 Superstico (1972?) ("Superstition")

In Hungarian 
 M. Fehér asszony, fekete férfi (Budapest, 1936)
 Halálsikoly az áradatban (Budapest, 1937)
 Kazohinia (Budapest, 1941)
 Gépvilág és más fantasztikus történetek (Budapest, 1972)
 Hiába (Budapest, 1991)

Translations into Hungarian
 Kredu min, Sinjorino ("Believe me, Mamm") de Cezaro Rosetti

References 
 Afterword by Keresztúry Dezso to Kazohinia (1952, 1972) and to Gépvilág és más fantasztikus történetek (Masinmondo) (Budapest, 1972)
 Keresztúry Dezso: Gulliver magyar utóda (The Hungarian Successor to Gulliver) (appeared in the Élet és Irodalom ["Life and Literature"] #41, 1974)
 Tasi Jószef: Néhány szó Szathmáry Sándorról ("Several Words about Sándor Szathmáry") (Életünk ["Our Life"], 1976. #4.)

Sources 
Vikipedio article in Esperanto

External links 
 

1897 births
1974 deaths
People from Gyula
Hungarian science fiction writers
20th-century Hungarian male writers
Hungarian satirists
20th-century Hungarian novelists
Writers of Esperanto literature
Hungarian Esperantists
Burials at Farkasréti Cemetery